Taxila haquinus, the harlequin or orange harlequin, is a small but striking butterfly from the family Riodinidae. It is found from India east to Palawan and south to Java. It is the only species in the genus Taxila.

See also 
 List of butterflies of India (Riodinidae)

References 

 
  
 
 
 
 

Nemeobiinae
Butterflies of Asia
Butterflies of Singapore
Butterflies described in 1847